Cephalopsetta ventrocellatus is a species of large-tooth flounder native to the Indian Ocean, from the Gulf of Oman in the west to the Andaman Sea in the east. Little else is known about this species.  It is the only known member of its genus.

References

Fish of the Indian Ocean
Paralichthyidae
Fish described in 1965